CJRA may refer to:
Civil Justice Reform Act
Crime and Justice Research Alliance